B. concinna may refer to:

 Baissea concinna, a plant used in traditional African medicine
 Banksia concinna, a Western Australian shrub
 Bilyaxia concinna, a jewel beetle
 Bossiaea concinna, an Australian plant
 Bulbine concinna, a succulent plant
 Buprestis concinna, a jewel beetle
 Bursa concinna, a sea snail